Brotteaux is a neighborhood in the 6th arrondissement of Lyon. It is situated between the Rhône and the track railway which leads to the Gare de la Part-Dieu. The urbanization of this area began in the late eighteenth century under the leadership of architect and urban planner Jean-Antoine Morand Jouffrey (1727-1794). The area is sometimes called Morand quarter.

Etymology
The word "Broteaux" (with one "t") means in Lyon-language an island in the Rhône alluvial plain and bounded by the river itself or one of its arms or lône. This word comes from Franco-Provençal language broteu, itself formed by brot, pronounced [bru], which means the young shoots of trees that grow here.

It seems that the current spelling with two "t", "brotteaux" has appeared in the early nineteenth century under the leadership of local government and against the protests of local scholars.

Current description
Brotteaux quarter hosts a large number of renowned restaurants such as the Splendid of Georges Blanc, a restaurant which is in front of the Est of Paul Bocuse. La Brasserie des Brotteaux is also an ideal place for those who like the Lyon's culinary traditions.

References

6th arrondissement of Lyon
Quarters of Lyon